Thomas Schneider may refer to:

 Thomas Franklin Schneider (1859–1938), American architect
 Thomas Schneider (Australian footballer) (born 1992), Australian rules footballer
 Thomas Schneider (footballer) (born 1972), German manager and former footballer
 Thomas Schneider (Egyptologist) (born 1964), German Egyptologist
 Thomas Schneider (rower) (born 1932), West German rower
 Thomas Schneider (sprinter) (born 1988), German athlete
 Amy Schneider (born 1979), American writer and game show contestant